Little Butte Creek is a  tributary of the Rogue River in the U.S. state of Oregon. Its two forks, the North Fork and the South Fork, both begin high in the Cascade Range near Mount McLoughlin and Brown Mountain. They both flow generally west until they meet near Lake Creek.

Little Butte Creek's watershed was originally settled by the Takelma, and possibly the Shasta tribes of Native Americans. In the Rogue River Wars of the 1850s, most of the Native Americans were either killed or forced onto Indian reservations. Early settlers named Little Butte Creek and nearby Big Butte Creek after their proximity to Mount McLoughlin, which was known as Snowy Butte. In the late 19th century, the watershed was primarily used for agriculture and lumber production. The city of Eagle Point was incorporated in 1911, and remains the only incorporated town within the watershed's boundaries.

Large amounts of water are diverted from Little Butte Creek for irrigation, water storage, and power generation. Canal systems deliver the water to nearby Howard Prairie Lake and the Klamath River watershed, Agate Lake, and the Rogue Valley.

Despite being moderately polluted, the creek is one of the best salmon-producing tributaries of the Rogue River. Coho and Chinook salmon migrate upstream each year; however, several dams hinder their progress. A fish ladder was built in 2005 to help fish swim past a dam constructed in Eagle Point in the 1880s, but was destroyed by flooding just three months later. It was rebuilt in 2008. Restoration of a  artificially straightened section of the creek in the Denman Wildlife Area was completed in 2011.

Course 
Little Butte Creek begins in the Cascade Range near Mount McLoughlin and Brown Mountain. There are two main forks of Little Butte Creek: the North Fork and the South Fork.

The north fork begins at Fish Lake, near Mount McLoughlin. It flows west, collecting only minor tributaries, before merging with the south fork. The south fork's headwaters are just south of the  Brown Mountain. The Pacific Crest Trail passes through this area. It flows west, receiving Beaver Dam Creek and Dead Indian Creek on the left bank. The Dead Indian Soda Springs are on Dead Indian Creek, about a mile south of its confluence with the south fork. The south fork then turns northwest, collecting water from Lost Creek on the left, near the Lost Creek Bridge, built in 1919.

Lake Creek drains . The main stem is crossed by South Fork Little Butte Creek Road in Lake Creek. Water is diverted here into the Joint System Canal for storage in Agate Lake and to provide irrigation for the Medford region. Oregon Route 140 crosses the creek at RM 10 (RK 16).

The creek turns southwest, flowing through Eagle Point. Four bridges span the stream in Eagle Point: East Main Street, Loto Street, and the Antelope Creek Bridge near RM 5 (RK 8), and Oregon Route 62 at RM 4 (RK 6). Near RM 3 (RK 5), Little Butte Creek receives Antelope Creek on the left. Antelope Creek is its largest tributary, draining . Agate Lake on Dry Creek is in the Antelope Creek watershed. At RM 1.5 (RK 2.4) the creek is crossed by Agate Road. It then flows into the Rogue River  from its mouth at the Pacific Ocean.

Discharge 

The United States Geological Survey monitored the flow of Little Butte Creek at seven different stream gauges: two on the south fork, three on the north fork, and two on the main stem. The first opened in 1908 at the newly constructed Fish Lake Dam on the north fork, while the last opened in 1927 near the Big Elk Ranger Station on the south fork. By 1989, all seven were closed. The data recorded by the lowermost gauges of both forks and the main stem are listed below.

Watershed 

Forest accounts for about 65 percent of the total area of the watershed, while 32 percent is farmland. The remaining three percent is within the Eagle Point city limits. Forty-eight percent of the watershed is federally owned, 50 percent is privately owned, and Eagle Point accounts for the remaining two percent. Over 10,000 people live within the watershed's boundaries.

The region experiences a Mediterranean climate. July through October are the driest months, while December through April are the wettest. Thirty-four percent of the surface runoff in the watershed is collected from rain, 31 percent from rain on snow, and 35 percent from snowmelt.

The two main geologic regions in the Little Butte Creek watershed are the High Cascades and the western Cascades. The western Cascades make up the western two thirds of the watershed, generally below  in elevation. Steep, rugged canyons are common in this region. The lower stretches of the watershed contain soils such as decomposed lavas, clay, and gravel. The High Cascades compose the eastern third of the watershed, including volcanoes such as Brown Mountain and Mount McLoughlin, and lava plateaus. Nearby watersheds include two Rogue River tributaries—Big Butte Creek to the north and Bear Creek to the south—and small Klamath River tributaries to the east.

As of 2003, there were 581 water rights recorded in the watershed, with 394 of them related to irrigation. Four hundred sixty-six water diversions were also recorded. In the summer, many streams are over-appropriated, leading to frequent water shortages along the lower portion of the creek.

Flora and fauna 

The flora in the Little Butte Creek watershed is predominately temperate coniferous forest, which makes up approximately 65 percent of the total area. The lower regions are covered with chaparral, and the upper regions by fir forests. The chaparral region is inhabited by oaks such as garry oak and California black oak, with an understory of buckbrush and manzanita. Coast douglas-fir, sugar pine, ponderosa pine, California incense-cedar, and white fir are the most common trees found in the mixed coniferous forest. Shasta red fir, white fir, and the noble fir grow in the higher elevations of the watershed. Mountain hemlock, lodgepole pine, Sitka mountain-ash, and squashberry also grow in this region. Chinquapin can be found around Fish Lake. The most common species of plants above  near the tree line on Mount McLoughlin and Brown Mountain include whitebark pine, mountain hemlock, Coast Range subalpine fir, heather, and mountain heather.

Many species of birds have been spotted in the Little Butte Creek region. Twenty-two species are known to breed in the chaparral region, including several species of wrens, blackbirds, and sparrows. The mixed coniferous forest is home to white-headed woodpeckers, pygmy nuthatches, green-tailed towhees, northern pygmy-owls, Vaux's swifts, winter wrens, and MacGillivray's warblers. The American coot has also been spotted in several places along the creek. Williamson's sapsuckers, black-backed woodpeckers, Canada jays, and hermit warblers frequent the higher elevations. The near-threatened olive-sided flycatcher and Cassin's finch also live in this area. Eurasian three-toed woodpeckers and Clark's nutcrackers have been spotted near the tree line. The endangered Townsend's big-eared bat is known to live in the watershed.

Little Butte Creek is known to be one of the best salmon producing tributaries of the Rogue River, and is also one of only a few streams in the Upper Rogue watershed to support salmon populations. The most common anadromous fish inhabiting the creek include chinook and coho salmon, and sea-run cutthroat trout. The Southern Oregon/Northern California Coast Coho Salmon Evolutionary Significant Unit is listed as  threatened (2011). An estimated 35,131 Coho salmon lived in the creek in 2002. Resident fish include coastal cutthroat trout, sculpins, rainbow trout, and brook trout.

History 
The Little Butte Creek area was originally settled by the Takelma, and possibly the Shasta tribe of Native Americans. The first non-indigenous settlers arrived in the Eagle Point region in 1852. Little Butte Creek was named by the early settlers for its close proximity to Mount McLoughlin (also known as Snowy Butte), as was nearby Big Butte Creek. Due to conflicts with the Rogue River Indians, Major J. A. Lupton gathered 35 men from Jacksonville on October 8, 1855, and attacked the Native Americans near the mouth of Little Butte Creek, killing about 30 of them. Lupton was also killed, and eleven of his men were injured. On December 24 of the same year, Captain Miles Alcorn discovered and attacked a Native American camp on the north fork, killing eight. On Christmas, the following day, another band of Native Americans were attacked near Little Butte Creek's mouth; some fled, while the rest were either captured or killed.

By the late 1850s, the land was primarily used for agriculture and lumber in the upper regions. A sawmill was constructed on the north fork in the 1870s. In 1901, the Sunnyside Hotel was built by Alfred Howlett on the banks of the creek in Eagle Point. Eagle Point was later incorporated in 1911, and remains the only incorporated town in the watershed. In 1917, manganese ore was discovered near the confluence of South Fork Little Butte Creek and its tributary, Lost Creek. Cinnabar was also discovered in the area. In 1922, the  Antelope Creek Covered Bridge was constructed on Antelope Creek. It was moved to Little Butte Creek in Eagle Point in 1987.

Diversions and dams 

In the late 19th century, a large number of orchards were planted near Ashland. They were initially irrigated by Bear Creek; however, there was not enough water to satisfy the orchards' needs. In 1898, the Fish Lake Water Company was established to solve the problem. The company proposed the enlargement of Fourmile and Fish lakes by impounding Fourmile Creek and North Fork Little Butte Creek, respectively, and connecting them via the Cascade Canal. Construction of the temporary Fish Lake Dam began in 1902. Around this time, construction of the Joint System Canal to the west also began. Construction of Fourmile Lake Dam started in 1906, along with the Cascade Canal. A network of other small canals, such as Hopkins Canal and the Medford Canal, were also built in the Rogue Valley around this time. Fish Lake Dam was completed in 1908, creating the  reservoir.

The temporary Fish Lake Dam was also replaced by a permanent earthfill dam. It was later modified in 1922 and 1955. In 1996 an auxiliary spillway was added.

In 1956, the United States Bureau of Reclamation awarded a contract to Portland, Oregon-based Lord Brothers to build the Deadwood Tunnel. The tunnel was finished in 1957. Dead Indian Creek is also diverted into Howard Prairie Lake.

The Howard Prairie Delivery Canal was completed in 1959, along with Keene Creek Reservoir, Cascade Tunnel, and Greensprings Tunnel. Nearby Hyatt Reservoir also provides water. It is then piped through the mile-long Cascade Tunnel to the Greensprings Power Plant, which generates about 18 megawatts of power. Afterward, the water is conveyed from the power plant  through the Greensprings Tunnel into Emigrant Creek, a tributary of Bear Creek.

Butte Creek Mill 

A diversion dam was built in the 1880s to provide water for the turbine that powers the mill. The dam was a damaging fish barrier in the watershed. In 2005, the Rogue Basin Fish Access Team built a $250,000 concrete fish ladder to allow fish to swim past the dam. The weir was rebuilt in 2008 for about $122,500, with concrete instead of boulders.

The mill is now included on the National Register of Historic Places, and is the only gristmill in Oregon to still grind flour. It is also the oldest water-powered gristmill west of the Mississippi River.

On Christmas morning, December 25, 2015, the store had a fire and was considered a total loss. There are plans to rebuild, which have been overtaken by a foundation dedicated to its reconstruction. In February 2021, the mill risked losing its ability to operate because of a possible sale of its water rights, which were ultimately sold to a conservation group which allowed the mill to operate while protecting local aquatic wildlife.

Restoration 
Intense flooding occurred throughout the Rogue Valley in 1955, and Little Butte Creek's meanders in the Denman Wildlife Area between Eagle Point and the Rogue River were blamed for severe erosion. The  section of the creek was subsequently bulldozed and straightened in the late 1950s and early 1960s. The straightness forced water downward instead of outward like a typical creek, scouring the stream bed down to bedrock and creating an unsuitable habitat for wild salmon. In 2007, a plan to divert the creek back into its old meanders was proposed. It was completed in September 2011.

Pollution 

The Oregon Department of Environmental Quality (DEQ) has monitored Little Butte Creek for eight different parameters that affect water quality: temperature, oxygen saturation, pH, nutrients, bacteria, chemical contaminants such as pesticides and metals, turbidity, and alkalinity. Streams that exceed the standard level are then placed on the DEQ 303d list in accordance with the Clean Water Act. About 40 percent of the streams in the Little Butte Creek watershed were listed on the 2002 DEQ 303d list. The entire main stem exceeded the standard level for temperature, oxygen saturation, fecal coliforms (bacteria), and turbidity. The lower  of the North Fork were listed for high temperature and elevated levels of E. coli, while the upper region was affected by chlorophyll a and pH levels. The South Fork was listed for turbidity and temperature.

Overall, high temperature is the most common problem in the Little Butte Creek watershed. This is most likely caused by water diversion and depleted riparian zones. Approximately 53 percent of riparian zones in the watershed are damaged due to agriculture or deforestation, while 43 percent are classified as healthy. Another threat to healthy riparian zones are invasive blackberries, which crowd out native vegetation and provide little shade. The resulting higher water temperatures can be very harmful to anadromous fish. High concentration of bacteria is also an issue.

In 2003, the Little Butte Creek Watershed Council rated the health of the Little Butte Creek watershed on a scale of 1 (slightly degraded) to 5 (severely degraded). Overall, the watershed received 2.95, or moderately degraded. On the Oregon Water Quality Index (OWQI) used by DEQ, water quality scores can vary from 10 (worst) to 100 (ideal). The average for Little Butte Creek at RM 1.4 (RK 2.3) between 1998 and 2007 was 72 (poor) in the summer and 82 (fair) in the fall, winter, and spring.

Recreation 
The Little Butte Creek watershed contains several points of interest. Popular activities in and around Fish Lake include fishing, swimming, and boating. Two campgrounds are on the banks of the lake: Doe Point and the Fish Lake Resort. Several trails in the area lead to the much larger Pacific Crest Trail. Two snowparks are on Oregon Route 140.

The Eagle Point Golf Course is in the watershed, built in 1995 by the world-renowned golf course architect Robert Trent Jones, Jr. Another course, Stone Ridge Golf Course, is near Agate Lake. The Butte Creek Mill and the Antelope and Lost Creek covered bridges are also popular attractions. Several historic structures can be found in Eagle Point, including the Eagle Point Museum, built in 1925 as the Long Mountain School, and the Walter Wood House, constructed in 1879. The Denman Wildlife Area is at the mouth of Little Butte Creek, as is nearby TouVelle State Park.

See also 
 List of rivers of Oregon

Notes and references 
Notes

References

Bibliography 
Books

 
 
 
 
 
 
 
 
 
 
 
 
 
 
 
 
 
 
 

News articles

 
 
 
 
 
 
 
 

Websites

 
 
 
 
 
 
 
 
 
 
 
 
 
 
 
 

Other

External links 
 

Rivers of Oregon
Rogue River (Oregon)
Rivers of Jackson County, Oregon
Rivers of Klamath County, Oregon
Eagle Point, Oregon
White City, Oregon